Nesoryzomys is a genus of rodent in the tribe Oryzomyini of family Cricetidae, endemic to the Galápagos Islands. Five species have been described, with two of them considered extinct.

Other rodents restricted to the Galápagos include Megaoryzomys curioi and Aegialomys galapagoensis.

References

Castañeda-Rico, S., Johnson, S. A., Clement, S. A., Dowler, R. C., Maldonado, J. E., & Edwards, C. W. (2019). Insights into the evolutionary and demographic history of the extant endemic rodents of the Galápagos Islands. Therya, 10(3). https://doi.org/10.12933/therya-19-873

 
Endemic fauna of the Galápagos Islands
Rodent genera
Taxonomy articles created by Polbot